3 Serpentis is a binary star in the constellation Serpens with an orbital period of approximately 66 years.  It is dimly visible to the naked eye with an apparent magnitude of 5.337.  Located around  distant, it is an orange giant of spectral type K0III, a star that has used up its core hydrogen.

The two components of 3 Serpentis can be resolved using speckle interferometry and were separated by 0.23" in 2014.  The orbit is highly eccentric and at periastron passage in 1997, the two are calculated to have been only 6 mas apart.

Individual spectra for the two components of 3 Serpentis cannot be obtained and the spectral type of K0III is for the two stars combined.  The primary is 2.5 magnitudes brighter than the secondary and cooler.  The combined spectral type indicates that the primary is likely to have evolved away from the main sequence, but comparison of the colour and brightness of the secondary suggest it is still a main sequence star.

References

Serpens (constellation)
Serpentis, 03
K-type giants
Durchmusterung objects
5674
135482
074649
Binary stars